John Hadlington (16 August 1933 – 9 August 2015) was an English footballer who played in the Football League for Walsall.

References

1933 births
2015 deaths
People from Brierley Hill
English footballers
Association football forwards
Cradley Heath F.C. players
Walsall F.C. players
Halesowen Town F.C. players
English Football League players